The 2011 Internazionali di Monza e Brianza was a professional tennis tournament played on indoor red clay courts. It was part of the 2011 ATP Challenger Tour. It took place in Monza, Italy between 4 and 10 April 2011.

ATP entrants

Seeds

Rankings are as of March 21, 2011.

Other entrants
The following players received wildcards into the singles main draw:
  Andrea Arnaboldi
  Laurynas Grigelis
  Stefano Ianni
  Thomas Muster

The following players received entry from the qualifying draw:
  Benjamin Balleret
  Alberto Brizzi
  Kenny de Schepper
  Gianluca Naso

Champions

Singles

 Julian Reister def.  Alessio di Mauro, 2–6, 6–3, 6–3

Doubles

 Johan Brunström /  Frederik Nielsen def.  Jamie Delgado /  Jonathan Marray, 5–7, 6–2, [10–7]

References
 Official website
 ITF search 
 ATP official site

Internazionali di Monza e Brianza
Internazionali di Monza E Brianza